HSC  Judita is a high speed catamaran passenger ship owned by Croatian shipping company Jadrolinija.

Sisterships: Dubravka, Karolina, Novalja.

See also
Supercat Fast Ferry Corporation

References

Passenger ships
Passenger ships of Croatia
Individual catamarans